Yulin Subdistrict is a subdistrict in Xinfu District, Fushun, Liaoning, China. , it has 3 residential communities and 2 villages under its administration.

See also 
 List of township-level divisions of Liaoning

References 

Township-level divisions of Liaoning
Fushun